Events from the year 1450 in Ireland.

Incumbent
Lord: Henry VI

Events
August 7 – Edmund Oldhall is appointed Bishop of Meath.
Richard Duke of York, Lord Lieutenant of Ireland, returns to England, following the submission of many Irish chiefs and English rebels.

Births
 Thomas Rochfort - a judge and cleric who held the offices of Solicitor General for Ireland

Deaths
Tadhg Ó Caiside, physician and Chief of the Name.

References

 
1450s in Ireland
Ireland
Years of the 15th century in Ireland